Baalveer 3  is an Indian Hindi-language fantasy television series that premiered on 18 March 2023 on Sony SAB. Produced by Vipul D. Shah under their banner Optimystix Entertainment. It digitally streams on SonyLIV and stars Dev Joshi and Aditi Sanwal. It is the third installment to the Baalveer franchise and is a sequel to Baal Veer and Baalveer Returns.

Cast
 Dev Joshi as Baalveer
 Aditi Sanwal as Kaashvi
 Ada Khan
 Behzaad Khan
 Aditya Ranvijay
 Patrali Chattopadhyay
 Aman Bhutada
 Mahima Gupta as Kinkodi
 Marina Kuwar
 Shweta Rastogi
 Atul Verma as Andher
 Sailesh Gulbani
 Ruchi Singh
 Geeta Bisht
 Vinayak Bhave
 Shahab Khan
 Hiya Bhatt 
 Kunal Seth

Production
In December 2022, the series was announced by Optimystix Entertainment for Sony SAB through an announcement teaser. Principal photography commenced in Mumbai, Dev Joshi was cast in the titular role, and was joined by Aditi Sanwal as leads. The promo featuring Joshi was released in February 2023.

See also 
 List of programmes broadcast by Sony SAB

References

External links
 
 Baalveer S3 on SonyLIV

2023 Indian television series debuts
2020s Indian television series
Hindi-language television shows
Indian fantasy television series
Sony SAB original programming
Television series by Optimystix Entertainment